Mores Creek Summit is a mountain pass in the western United States in southwest Idaho, at an elevation of  above sea level. Traversed by State Highway 21, the Ponderosa Pine Scenic Byway, it is located in Boise County in the Boise National Forest.

Mores Creek Summit marks the divide between the Boise River (north fork) and 
Payette River (south fork) drainage areas.  The summit is northeast of Idaho City and southwest of Lowman.

Mores Creek is a tributary of the Boise River.

References

External links
Visit Idaho.org - official state tourism site
MoresCreekSummit.com - Backcountry Skiing information for Mores Creek Summit Area

Mountain passes of Idaho
Landforms of Boise County, Idaho
Transportation in Boise County, Idaho